The 2015 Ronde van Overijssel was a one-day women's cycle race held in the Netherlands on 1 May 2015. It was the second edition of the Ronde van Overijssel, and had a UCI rating of 1.1.

Results

See also
 2015 in women's road cycling

References

Ronde van Overijssel
Ronde van Overijssel
Ronde van Overijssel